The 1970 FIFA World Cup qualification UEFA Group 3 was a UEFA qualifying group for the 1970 FIFA World Cup. The group comprised East Germany, Italy and Wales.

Standings

Matches

External links 
Group 3 Detailed Results at RSSSF

3
1968–69 in East German football
1969–70 in East German football
1968–69 in Italian football
1969–70 in Italian football
1968–69 in Welsh football
1969–70 in Welsh football